Highway 911 is a provincial highway in the north-east region of the Canadian province of Saskatchewan. It runs from Highway 106 to a dead end at Deschambault Lake.  Highway 911 is approximately 31 km (19 mi) long.

See also 
Roads in Saskatchewan
Transportation in Saskatchewan

References 

911